Eternity Rites is the debut studio album by the Austrian neoclassical dark wave  band Dargaard, released in 1998 by Napalm Records under the Draenor Productions banner. The album was recorded and mixed at Hoernix Studios by 
Georg Hranda and Tharen during 1998. It instills a dark rhythm and develops "a climactic fairytale full of medieval/folk themes beautifully composed and perfectly performed".

The album includes eleven tracks, two of which are different parts of the song Eternity Rites. All the tracks are composed in mixture of neo-classical, folk and dark ambient music.

The vocals of Elisabeth Toriser, the soprano with an operatic voice is also highly appreciated through most of reviews, which is "both clear and powerful, yet strangely delicate."

Track listing

 "Fuer grissa ost drauka" is the title given to Richard Rahl, a character in the epic fantasy book series The Sword of Truth by Terry Goodkind. The title is in High D'Haran language and has several meanings: "the bringer of death", "the bringer of spirits" and "the bringer of the underworld".
 The lyrics to "Arcanum Mortis" are taken from Ovid's Fasti, Book II, 571-582.''

Credits
Tharen - all instruments, vocals
Elisabeth Toriser - vocals

References

1998 debut albums
Dargaard albums
Neoclassical dark wave albums
Dark ambient albums